Legal Affairs was an American legal magazine that was launched under the auspices of Yale Law School, and which later became an independent non-profit venture with an educational mission. As the first general-interest legal magazine, Legal Affairs featured stories that centered on the intersection of law and everyday life. The award-winning magazine was a finalist for National Magazine Awards in the categories of general excellence and public interest reporting. Legal Affairs was founded in 2002 by Lincoln Caplan, who was previously an editor at U.S. News & World Report and a Staff Writer for The New Yorker. It ceased publication in 2006.

External links 
 
 Examples of the print magazine, designed by Point Five Design
 The New York Times: Legal Affairs, a Magazine of Ideas, Severs Its Ties to Yale Law School
 The Chicago Tribune: Demise of Legal Affairs Proves There's No Justice

Bimonthly magazines published in the United States
Defunct magazines published in the United States
Education magazines
Legal magazines
Magazines established in 2002
Magazines disestablished in 2006
Magazines published in Connecticut
Mass media in New Haven, Connecticut
Yale Law School